Yarosh is a Ukrainian surname. Related surnames include Jaroš, Jarosz, Jarosch, Yaroshenko, and Yaroshchuk. Notable people with this surname include:

 Anatoliy Yarosh (born 1952), Ukrainian athlete
 Danika Yarosh (born 1998), American actress
 Dmytro Yarosh (born 1971), Ukrainian politician
 Lana Yarosh (born 1983), American computer scientist
 Tetiana Yarosh (born 1984), Ukrainian gymnast

See also
 

Ukrainian-language surnames